In Winter's Shadow is the final book in a trilogy of fantasy novels written by Gillian Bradshaw. It tells the story of King Arthur's downfall, as recounted by his wife Gwynhwyfar.

Plot summary

After the murder of the feared sorceress Morgawse by her own son Agravain (as told in Kingdom of Summer), her youngest son Medraut goes to Camlann, the stronghold of his enemy, Arthur. Inasmuch as he is Medraut's uncle, Arthur has no excuse to send him away. Once there, Medraut begins to build up a faction loyal only to him among the warriors of the royal warband.

Another newcomer is Gwynn, the young, illegitimate son of the abbess Elidan. He goes to work for Gwynhwyfar. Gwalchmai, Arthur's best cavalry fighter (and Medraut's other brother), takes an interest in the boy and helps him train to be a warrior.

Medraut succeeds in sowing dissent and distrust in the warband; finally, there is a duel between one of his men and Bedwyr, Arthur's most valued advisor. Though Gwynhwyfar is able to effect a reconciliation, the situation continues to deteriorate. In desperation, she tries to poison Medraut at a banquet, but he is aware of her plan and denounces her at the gathering. To discredit him, Arthur takes the poisoned mead and pretends to drink it. However, the dishonorable plot drives a wedge between him and Gwynhwyfar. At least one good thing seems to come of the botched attempt - Arthur has an excuse to exile Medraut, sending him back to his homeland, where Agravain rules. Later, they receive news that Agravain has died and that Medraut has been made king.

With her husband turned against her, Gwynhwyfar turns to Bedwyr for comfort. Before they have time to consider their actions, they become lovers.

Meanwhile, Gwynn receives news from home. His mother has died. On her deathbed, she wrote a letter to Gwalchmai, in which she forgives him for seducing her and killing her brother when he rebelled against Arthur. She also reveals that Gwynn is their son. Gwalchmai is overjoyed and quickly has the lad legitimized. Arthur takes an interest when he realizes that Gwynn has a good claim to inherit his throne. In addition, the hatred for Arthur by Gwynn's mother's powerful clan would be eased.

The next year, Medraut arrives for a visit. As a king in his own right, he is no longer bound by the exile imposed on him. During his stay, his realm revolts against his reign of terror, leaving Medraut stranded in Camlann, free once more to undermine his great enemy. Soon, Arthur's warband is split in two once again. In a master stroke, Medraut arranges to uncover Bedwyr and Gwynhwyfar's adultery in front of witnesses from both factions. Though the traditional punishment is death, Arthur exiles them instead, Bedwyr to his native Less Britain, Gwynhwyfar back to her clan, unaware that her clan's leader hates her.

Gwynhwyfar is escorted by a number of warriors, among them Medraut and Gwynn. The party is intercepted by Bedwyr and his men and fighting breaks out. Gwynhwyfar sends Gwynn to try to stop it, but in the confusion, Bedwyr kills him by mistake. He then takes Gwynhwyfar with him to his homeland.

When Gwalchmai is told of his son's death, he demands justice from Arthur. Macsen, king of Less Britain and no friend of Arthur's, refuses to return Bedwyr and Gwynhwyfar. Indeed, realizing that Arthur must now fight, he persuades Bedwyr to become his military commander. In the ensuing war, Arthur is unable to win a decisive battle; Bedwyr knows too well how he fights. In one clash, Bedwyr attacks Gwalchmai, half hoping to be slain, but instead he deals his former friend a serious wound to the head. Sickened by all that has happened, Gwynhwyfar steals away and returns to Arthur.

He sends her back to Camlann for safety. But when she arrives, she is captured by Medraut. He had killed or imprisoned the men Arthur left to watch him and now controls the fortress. Gwynhwyfar escapes and begins gathering men and supplies for Arthur's return. When her husband hears of Medraut's revolt, he hurries back with his army. But Medraut has allied with King Maelgwn, and the opposing forces are nearly equal in strength.

Gwalchmai is sent by Arthur to Gwynhwyfar, to arrange an ambush for Medraut's army. He dies shortly afterwards, of the wound Bedwyr inflicted; after his son was slain, he had neglected the injury, having lost the will to live.

The ambush is only partly successful and the Battle of Camlann does not go exactly as Arthur had hoped, but he is victorious. However, most of his warband is killed. Arthur personally leads the final cavalry charge that breaks the rebels, but is then seen no more.

In the aftermath, Medraut is mistakenly brought in with the rest of the wounded; Gwynhwyfar recognizes him and they converse for a short while before he dies. When days go by without word of Arthur, Gwynhwyfar finally admits to herself that he is dead. She becomes a nun in a northern abbey run by a friend.

As the years pass, she eventually becomes the head of the abbey. While she despairs of the ruin of all that she and Arthur had tried to build, she finds a bit of solace from an unlikely source. While civilization and learning ebb among the Britons, monks from Ireland arrive and build a monastery on a little island called Iona, working to accumulate and preserve knowledge.

1982 American novels
American fantasy novels
Modern Arthurian fiction
Novels set in sub-Roman Britain